The hyoid apparatus is the collective term used in veterinary anatomy for the bones which suspend the tongue and larynx. It consists of pairs of stylohyoid, thyrohyoid, epihyoid and ceratohyoid bones, and a single basihyoid bone. The hyoid apparatus resembles the shape of a trapeze, or a bent letter "H". The basihyoid bone lies within the muscle at the base of the tongue.

In humans, the single hyoid bone is an equivalent of the hyoid apparatus.

References

Bird anatomy
Mammal anatomy
Human head and neck